Busan Institute of Science and Technology is a private college located in Buk District, Busan, South Korea. It was called  Busan College of Information Technology until February 2012.

History  
Founded in 1976 at Uam-dong, Nam-gu the school welcomed its first students in 1977, at which time it was known as Sungji Technical Professional School. It was renamed and reorganized in 1979 as Sungji Technical Junior College. The campus was moved to its current location in 1985. The college changed to its name, to reflect its focus on high technology in 1998 as Busan College of Information Technology.

Courses 
BIST consists of 4 departments and 25 different schools. The departments of BIST are School of Engineering, School of Humanities and Social Science, School of Natural Sciences and School of Arts and Physical Studies

Colleges 

 School of Engineering
 Fusion Machine
 Major in CAD / CAM 
 Major in Computer Applied Design
 Automotive Engineering
 Major in Automobile High-tech
 Major in Automobile Tuning
 Major in SUV / BOSCH
 Major in Hybrid/Electric Vehicle
 Computer Information
 Electrical Automation
 Aviation Electronics
 Communication
 Smart Electronics
 Fine Chemistry
 Fire Safety Management
 Architecture
 Drone Space Information
 School of Humanities and Social Science
 Child Education
 Medical Administration
 Business Administration
 Police/Security
 Social Welfare
 Social Welfare
 Child Welfare and Care
 Hotel Tourism Management
 Korea-China Business
 School of Natural Sciences
 Glasses Optics
 Dental Hygiene
 Nursing
 Hotel/Restaurant&Cook
 School of Arts and Physical Studies
 Beauty
 Rehabilitation Exercise and Health
 Design
 Major in Industrial Design
 Major in Fashion Design
 Major in Jewelry

Campus 
Busan Institute of Science and Technology  is situated Buk District, Busan.

Facilities

Presidents 
 Kang Gi-sung (강기성) 2013.03.01 - Present
 Seo Yong-Beom 2010.02.01 - 2013.03.01
 Oh Jeong-seok 2008.09.08 - 2010-02-01
 Kang Ki-sung 2001.01.05 - 2008.09.08
 Jeong Soon-Young 1991.02.27 - 2001.01.0
 Lee Yoon Geun 1987.01.01 - 1991.02.27
 Choi Hak-yu 1986.01.01 - 1987.01.01
 Choi Jeong-Rak 1983.02.01 - 1986.01.01
 Park Hwa-sul 1977.03.01 - 1983.02.01

See also 
List of colleges and universities in South Korea

References

External links 
 

Universities and colleges in Busan